The Kaisyuan Night Market is a night market in Cianjhen District, Kaohsiung, Taiwan. Together with the adjacent Jin-Zuan Night Market, they form the largest night market in Taiwan.

History
The night market was opened on 29 July 2013.

Architecture
The night market covers an area of 46,000m2 and consists of around 1,000 vendors and stalls.

Features
The market contains stalls selling items such as food, beer, clothes, and souvenirs. There are many places for children to play, such as playgrounds and swings.

Transportation
The night market is accessible by the free shuttle bus or by walking about 600 meters (200 feet) northeast from Exit 2 of the Kaisyuan Station of Kaohsiung MRT. The market is located directly across the road from the Kaisyuan Rueitian light rail station.

Opening Hours
The night market is open from 5PM until midnight, from Thursday to Sunday.

See also
 List of night markets in Taiwan

References

2013 establishments in Taiwan
Night markets in Kaohsiung